Bernardo Alvarado Monzón (8 November 1925 – ) was a Guatemalan communist leader. He led the clandestine Guatemalan Party of Labour (PGT), and became its general secretary. Under Alvarado's leadership the party adopted the line of "Popular Revolutionary War."

Alvarado was captured by state forces on 26 September 1972 in Guatemala City. He was killed soon thereafter.

References

1925 births
1972 deaths
Guatemalan Party of Labour politicians
Guatemalan people who died in prison custody
Prisoners who died in Guatemalan detention